Crissé is a commune in the Sarthe department in the Pays de la Loire region in north-western France.

See also
Communes of the Sarthe department
Parc naturel régional Normandie-Maine

References

Communes of Sarthe